Accesso Technology Group PLC (formerly Lo-Q) is a publicly listed technology company based in Berkshire, England. Accesso has 9 offices across the world, and serves 1000 venues globally, providing ticketing, point of sale, virtual queuing, distribution and guest experience management solutions.

History
Accesso was established around 2000, and had entered bankruptcy almost immediately. The company then reemerged in 2007.

At the time, Lo-Q focused on developing ride-reservation systems for theme parks, while accesso focused on online and mobile ticket sales software and the management of online ticket stores. The merger was seen as a joining of synergistic capabilities and complementary customer sets. Tom Burnet was the CEO of Lo-Q and retained this role after the merger. At the time of the merger, accesso's CEO and owner was former Disney executive Steve Brown; after the merger, Brown joined the board of the new company and became the COO of North American operations.

In November 2013, Lo-Q was renamed as accesso to reflect the company's operations. In December 2013, accesso acquired for the Taos, New Mexico-based ticketing and point-of-sale software provider Siriusware. The acquisition provided accesso with a client base that included the ski and snow sports market. On 10 November 2014, accesso acquired VisionOne and their ShoWare ticketing product, a customizable cloud-based ticket sales product, expanding the company's client base into entertainment markets such as theaters, sports stadiums and music festivals. On 30 March 2017, accesso acquired Ingresso, a global distribution system for entertainment ticketing. Later in 2017, the company acquired The Experience Engine (TE2), a guest experience management company, which included customers in venues such as theme parks, ski resorts, hotels, quick service food, healthcare and other hospitality-focused operations.

In 2014, penetration of the South Korean market began via a three-year partnership with an in-country consulting firm.

Products 

Accesso offers products for ticketing, virtual queuing, distribution, guest experience and point of sale. 

 accesso LoQueue Virtual Queuing: 
 Introduced in 2001, accesso’s patented accesso LoQueue virtual queuing product allows guests to wait in virtual lines as opposed to physical ones.
 Products for virtual queuing include the Qbot (retired), Qband (retired), Qsmart, and Prism. Several patents have been registered for their concepts.
 accesso Passport ticketing suite:
 Used by venues including Cedar Fair, Six Flags, and Palace Entertainment. In 2015, Merlin Entertainments Group signed a long term agreement with accesso.
 accesso Siriusware ticketing & point of sale:
 offers guest management, ticketing, e-commerce and point-of-sale solutions for a wide variety of venues and attractions.
 accesso ShoWare live entertainment ticketing:
 The accesso ShoWare live event ticketing suite provides customizable, cloud-based ticket sales software.

See also
 Disney's Fastpass
 List of Flash Pass attractions

References

 
Companies based in Berkshire
Technology companies established in 2000
Technology companies based in London
Amusement park companies
2000 establishments in England